Mehmet Yılmaz may refer to:

Mehmet Yılmaz (footballer, born 1979), Turkish footballer
Mehmet Yılmaz (footballer, born 1988), Turkish footballer
Mehmet Yılmaz (weightlifter) (born 1974), Turkish weightlifter